Link flap is a condition where a communications link alternates between up and down states. Link flap can be caused by end station reboots, power-saving features, incorrect duplex configuration or marginal connections and signal integrity issues on the link.

References

Computer networking